Hans Creek is a stream in the U.S. state of West Virginia.

Hans Creek derives its name from John Hand (or Hance), a pioneer settler.

See also
List of rivers of West Virginia

References

Rivers of Monroe County, West Virginia
Rivers of West Virginia